Iron Man's armor is a fictional, powered exoskeleton appearing in American comic books published by Marvel Comics. It is built and worn by billionaire Tony Stark when he assumes the identity of the superhero Iron Man. The first armor, which was created in the story by Stark and Ho Yinsen, was designed by artists Don Heck and Jack Kirby, and first appeared in Tales of Suspense #39 (March 1963).

In the fictional multiverse, the appearance of Stark's armor has radically changed over the years, either as a result of modifications made by Stark or specialized armors created for specific situations. In real life, it changed as different artists took over the series and decided to change it to what they wanted.

Overview

Stark's suits are each unique in design and purpose. They are made of incredibly strong, fictional materials bolstered by a force field. Every suit has a self-contained environment, assorted onboard weapons systems, enhanced strength, flight, and various communications arrays and sensors, such as radar and radio. Furthermore, they typically have multiple power sources including a secondary solar energy collection function in the event that conventional recharging methods are unavailable. Earlier versions of the armor could also fold virtually flat, allowing Stark to store them in his bullet-proof briefcase.

The defining abilities of Stark's armor are the jets situated in the boots and the repulsors situated in the gauntlets. The repulsors originated as a hand attachment, but have since become the armor's most important standard armament. They have been referred to as a force beam. In the 2008 film, the repulsors are a form of propulsion as well as steering and braking jets.

Another defining trait is the chest-mounted "uni-beam", also known as the varibeam, pentabeam, tri-beam, and chest repulsor transmitter. Originally it had a spotlight and "proton beam", but it has grown to accommodate a number of other weapons, primarily light and force-based.

20th century armors

Iron Man Armor MK II (Golden Avenger) 
First Appearance: Tales of Suspense #40 (April 1963)
In order to make this armor less frightening to the general public, Stark created a gold-colored version with a wide array of improvements over the original.

Iron Man Armor MK III 

This was the first armor to use the red-and-gold color scheme. The 2007 retcon miniseries Iron Man: Hypervelocity hinted that Stark based the new cosmetic improvement on a childhood fantasy, as the red and gold color scheme came from his elementary school's colors, and the whole "Iron Man" motif from the eponymous song by Black Sabbath.

Iron Man Armor MK VII (Silver Centurion) 

Though this armor debuted before the return to the title by the creative team of David Michelinie and Bob Layton, Layton revealed in 1996 that he designed the Silver Centurion. He wrote that "Mark Gruenwald and associates came to me and asked me to come up with a 'Samurai-type armor' for the series. Gruenie was a big believer in overhauling the Armored Avenger on a regular basis." Layton also revealed that the original color scheme for the armor was red and black. He does not know who changed the original black color to silver.

Modular Armor 
First Appearance: Iron Man #300 (January 1994)
The Modular Armor is the main armor in the Iron Man animated TV series and Capcom's Marvel vs. Capcom video game series.

Prometheum Armor ("Heroes Reborn") 
First Appearance: Iron Man (vol. 2) #1 (November 1996)
The paradigm of this armor was quite different from the one Iron Man had worn for years in the baseline universe, but the arrangement of weapons as well as the color scheme remained similar. Writer Scott Lobdell confirmed in an online discussion that the secret of the Prometheum Armor was nanotechnology.

Renaissance Armor ("Heroes Return")/Sentient armor 
First Appearance: Iron Man (vol. 3) #1 (February 1998)
This armor possessed a "horned" faceplate reminiscent of the first red-and-gold armor, as writer Kurt Busiek said that he liked Iron Man's helmet from early Avengers issues, and a pentagonal chest beam.

21st century armors

Cobalt Man impostor
First Appearance: Avengers/Thunderbolts #1 (May 2004)
This armor was used to impersonate the Cobalt Man.

Mark 1616 (Rescue) 
First Appearance: The Invincible Iron Man #10 (April 2009)
A version of the Rescue armor is adapted into the 2019 feature film Avengers: Endgame, in which Potts, who is married to Stark, wears the armor when joining the battle in the film's climax, and fights side by side with Stark against Thanos forces.

Bleeding Edge Armor 
First Appearance: Invincible Iron Man' #25 (June 2010)
In Invincible Iron Man #25 (2010), Stark creates a new armor in the aftermath of the "Stark: Disassembled" storyline. Created by writer Matt Fraction and artist Ryan Meinerding, this new armor is sleeker in appearance, and is featured in the 2010 crossover storyline, the "Heroic Age".

 Black and Gold Armor 
First appearance: Iron Man (vol. 5) #1 (January 2013)
This gun-metal grey armor debuted in the first part of the 2012 "Believe" storyline, which launched the fifth volume of the Iron Man series as part of the Marvel NOW! initiative. This version of the armor is a TestBed for new suits, and is composed of "smart-metals [that] align to a subdermal ghost of a skeleton".

 Heavy Duty armor 
First appearance: Iron Man (vol. 5) #4 (February 2013)
Described as starting "where War Machine leaves off", the Heavy Duty armor is a large, bulky suit that focuses on firepower. In addition to standard repulsor weaponry, the armor possesses a large rotary cannon that is built into the left arm, and a gun turret positioned over the right shoulder.

 Endo-Sym Armor 
First appearance: Superior Iron Man #1 (November 2014)
Stark begins using the Endo-Sym armor, which features a chrome finish, in the beginning of the 2014 "Avengers & X-Men: AXIS" storyline. When writer Tom Taylor and artist Yildiray Cinar created the armor, they designed it to glow red/orange when Tony was angry.

 Model-Prime Armor (Model 51)
First appearance: Invincible Iron Man (vol. 2) #1 (October 2015)
Tony Stark begins using a red and gold suit called the Model-Prime Armor (Model 51) in the 2015 series Invincible Iron Man (Vol 2), which is part of the All-New, All-Different Marvel branding. It was added as a skin to the Square Enix video game Marvel's Avengers on January 5, 2023. Among the armor's unique features is the ability to shapeshift according to the tactical needs in a given situation.

Other versionsUltimate Iron Man - The Tony Stark of the Ultimate Marvel universe wears an armor that is bulkier and more difficult to operate. After the events of Cataclysm, Tony funds and is a member of the Ultimate version of the Future Foundation, donning a purple, blue and white armor and returning to the Iron Man mantle.
Ironheart armor from Avataars: Covenant of the Shield.
In the 2007 New Avengers/Transformers miniseries, Stark used a giant armor, the size of a Transformer.

In other media
Film

Live-action

In the Marvel Cinematic Universe, Tony Stark, portrayed by Robert Downey Jr., has worn and created multiple armors. He also designed suits for James Rhodes / War Machine, Peter Parker / Spider-Man, and Pepper Potts. Obadiah Stane has developed a suit of his own, "Iron Monger".

In an alternate timeline in What If...?, Stark's father Howard develops a "Hydra Stomper" suit for the non-superpowered Steve Rogers.

Animated

In the 2007 direct-to-DVD film The Invincible Iron Man'', Stark with James Rhodes' help creates a grey and bulky suit of armor (similar to the original Iron Man armor that Stark and Yinsen created in the comics) in order to escape from caves.

Notes

References

External links
 "The Armory Armoire". The Invincible Iron Man Armory
 "The Reality of Iron Man". Emory University. YouTube. May 4, 2010
 

Fictional elements introduced in 1963
Armor
Fictional armour